The 2019 Orlando mayoral election was held on November 5, 2019 to elect the mayor of Orlando.

Municipal elections in Orlando and Orange County are non-partisan. If no candidate receives a majority of the votes in the general election, runoffs are held between the two candidates that received the greatest number of votes.

Candidates

Declared
Buddy Dyer, incumbent mayor who will be running for his fifth term, affiliated with the Democratic Party.
Jentri D. Casaberry, motivational speaker, political activist, affiliated with the Democratic Party
Samuel Ings, Democratic member of the Orlando City Council from District 6 and 2004 mayoral candidate
Aretha Simons, non-profit business woman, affiliated with the Democratic Party
Shantelle Bennett

Results
The election was held on November 5, 2019, the incumbent mayor Buddy Dyer won by a large margin.

References

2019
2019 Florida elections
2019 United States mayoral elections
2010s in Orlando, Florida